Tone Skogen (born 12 September 1953) is a Norwegian civil servant and politician for the Conservative Party, and a State Secretary in Norway's Ministry of Foreign Affairs.

She served as a member of Akershus county council for sixteen years, and was a State Secretary in the Ministry of Trade and Industry between 2001 and 2005, as a part of Bondevik's Second Cabinet. She works as a head of department in the Ministry of Petroleum and Energy, and has been a board member of Ruter, Vinmonopolet and Oslo University Hospital. She grew up at Østerås and resides at Fossum.

References

1953 births
Living people
Norwegian civil servants
Conservative Party (Norway) politicians
Bærum politicians
Norwegian state secretaries
Norwegian women state secretaries